Elections to Trafford Council were held on 7 May 1987.  One third of the council was up for election, with each successful candidate to serve a four-year term of office, expiring in 1991. The council remained under no overall control.

After the election, the composition of the council was as follows:

Ward results

References

1987 English local elections
1987
1980s in Greater Manchester